Matteo Mancuso (born 22 November 1996) is an Italian jazz and rock guitarist from Palermo, Sicily. Mancuso does not use a guitar pick and he uses a unique finger-style right hand technique.

Early life
Mancuso was born in 1996 in Palermo. He started playing guitar with his father Vincenzo at the age of 10. He went on to study classical guitar in the high school in Palermo.

Career
Mancuso has played with many of Sicily's musicians. "He continues to play with his father Vincenzo Mancuso with whom he plays a wide repertoire from Django Reinhardt to contemporary jazz."

Mancuso performed at NAMM 2019 in Los Angeles. He also performed at the Young Guitarist Festival in Bangkok, Thailand.

In 2022, Mancuso performed with Al Di Meola in the thirty-first edition of Eddie Lang Jazz Festival.

SNIPS
In 2017, Mancuso founded a trio called “SNIPS”, which includes Salvatore Lima, on drums and Riccardo Oliva on bass. SNIPS is a jazz fusion band and their music is based on rearrangements of popular fusion standards and original compositions. Recently the trio has played at the Musika-Expo in Rome and in April at Musikmesse in Frankfurt.

Style
Mancuso has developed a unique finger style technique: at times he uses his picking hand like Wes Montgomery and he switches to using a rest stroke with his index finger and middle finger to pick the strings like a classical guitar player. It is a unique finger-style right hand technique. Mancuso is followed by a large international audience on the internet. He has been called a virtuoso on the guitar.

"There's this Italian kid on the internet—Matteo Mancuso. He's 20 or something. He plays an SG and he does this almost flamenco-style thing. I mean, he's a virtuoso beyond virtuosos." Tosin Abasi

Endorsements and gear
Mancuso is sponsored by Yamaha and Line 6. Mancuso plays a Yamaha Revstar 720B equipped with a Bigsby Vibrato and 2 VT5 humbuckers. He also uses a Line 6 Helix LT pedalboard and a Fractal AX8. Early on Mancuso played a Gibson SG guitar. 

Mancuso used MAMA pickups in his guitar.

See also
 Fingerstyle guitar

References

External links
Matteo Mancuso in 2014 developing his fingerstyle technique
Matteo Mancuso in 2018 developing his fingerstyle technique

1996 births
Living people
Italian male guitarists
Progressive rock guitarists
21st-century guitarists
Italian jazz guitarists
Italian rock guitarists
Country guitarists
Musicians from Palermo
Jazz-blues guitarists
21st-century Italian male musicians